The 2022 World Games were an international multi-sport event held from July 7 to 17, 2022, in Birmingham, Alabama, United States. They were the 11th World Games, a multi-sport event featuring disciplines of Olympic sports and other competitions that are not currently contested at the Olympic Games; the Games featured 3,600 athletes competing in 206 medal events over 30 sports.

They were originally scheduled to be held in 2021, but were postponed by one year due to the COVID-19 pandemic. They were the second edition of the World Games to be hosted by the United States since their inaugural edition in 1981.

Bidding process
The cities that bid for the 2022 Games were:
 Lima, Peru
 Ufa, Russia
 Birmingham, United States

Barcelona and Santiago also considered bids. Cities paid a $125,000 application fee, and submitted information about "venues, infrastructure, volunteers, budget, transportation[,] and other elements".

Birmingham's bid, publicly announced in June 2014, was presented by Edgar Welden, Scott Myers, and David Benck. It was the only American city authorized to make a bid for these games. Myers, the executive director of the Alabama Sports Hall of Fame and Museum, said the bid was "a dream, but it's not a pipe dream. It's attainable." At the time, organizers projected a budget of $75 million, and the Greater Birmingham Convention and Visitors Bureau anticipated a windfall of between $224.4 million and $288.6 million in out-of-town dollars.

On January 22, 2015, at its meeting in Lausanne, the International World Games Association (IWGA) elected Birmingham as host of the 2021 World Games.

On April 4, 2020, the Games were postponed to 2022 due to the COVID-19 pandemic and the associated postponement of the 2020 Summer Olympics.

Venues
Venues for The World Games 2022 include:

 Avondale Park – archery
 Barber Motorsports Park – air sports (canopy piloting)
 Bessie Estell Park – boules sports
 Birmingham Crossplex
 Bill Harris Arena: artistic skating, inline hockey 
 Natatorium: canoe polo, finswimming, lifesaving 
 Indoor Track: wheelchair rugby
 Birmingham Jefferson Convention Complex
 Concert Hall: powerlifting 
 East Exhibition Hall: floorball, korfball 
 Legacy Arena: dancesport (Latin, rock n roll, standard), gymnastics (acrobatic, aerobic, rhythmic, trampoline and tumbling)
 North Exhibition Hall: bowling 
 Sheraton Hotel Ballroom: billiards sports 
 Birmingham Southern College
 Bill Battle Coliseum: ju-jitsu, karate, wushu 
 BSC Panther Soccer Field: fistball 
 campus: orienteering (sprint)
 Boutwell Auditorium – kickboxing, muay thai, sumo
 Hoover Metropolitan Stadium – softball
 John Carroll Catholic High School – flying disc
 Legion Field – flag football
 Oak Mountain State Park
 Double Oak Lake: canoe marathon, water skiing and wakeboard
 nature: orienteering (middle distance)
 Powell Steam Plant – track speedskating, road speedskating
 Protective Stadium – opening and closing ceremonies, air sports (drone racing)
 Railroad Park – duathlon (start and finish), orienteering (sprint relay)
 Regions Field – orienteering (part of sprint relay) 
 Sloss Furnaces – beach handball, dancesport (breaking), gymnastics (parkour), sport climbing
 University of Alabama at Birmingham
 PNC Field: lacrosse
 University Recreation Center: racquetball, squash
 track and field complex: tug of war

The Games

Sports
The 2022 World Games programme featured 30 official sports including 54 disciplines encompassing 206 events. This was the first time that drone racing, canoe marathon, breaking, women's fistball, kickboxing, and parkour were included in the World Games as official sports. Softball and racquetball returned to the official World Games programme. Invitational sports comprising 17 events included duathlon, flag football, wheelchair rugby, wushu (taolu) and men's lacrosse. Both men's and women's field lacrosse were played in a six-a-side format. The numbers in parentheses indicate the number of medal events contested in each sports discipline.

AD
AD
T
P
AD
B
P

P
T
B
AD

T
B
I
B
T
B
M
M
M
B

T
M
T
AD
 S
B
AD
T
B
T
B
M
T
AD
S
T

Notes
AD: Artistic and Dance sports
B: Ball sports
I: Invitational sports, selected by the host city
M: Martial arts
P: Precision sports
S: Strength sports
T: Trend sports

Participating nations
On February 19, 2021, the International Olympic Committee announced that certain Russian athletes would be allowed to compete under the designation "ROC" (for Russian Olympic Committee) at the Tokyo 2020 and Beijing 2022 Winter Games. This penalty also applies through end of 2022 and would have been applied to events affiliated with the International Olympic Committee, such as The World Games.

Following the 2022 Russian invasion of Ukraine, athletes from Russia along with Belarus were barred from the 2022 World Games, per the IOC's recommendations. Russia originally qualified 62 athletes while Belarus was set to send 11 athletes. Part of the ticket revenue was donated to Ukraine for rebuilding sports venues after the Russian invasion of the country.

Athletes from 110 National Olympic Committees were scheduled to participate. In total, athletes from 99 delegations competed at the 2022 World Games. The only representative team in the 2022 World Games not represented by a National Olympic Committee were the Haudenosaunee teams competing in lacrosse.

Costs
The games cost $65.1 million to produce.  It also provided a economic boost of about $165 million.  However, after only generating $51 million in revenue from sponsorships and tickets, and a $5 million dollar bailout from the city of Birmingham, it resulted in a current loss of $10 million.  In August 2022, Games CEO Nick Sellers said in a statement: “We have every intention to raise the associated funds and pay our vendors.”

Calendar
Source

Medal table

In the Women's 4 × 50 m obstacle relay of the lifesaving competition, two gold medals were awarded and thus no silver medal was awarded. In the Women's 500 m sprint of the track speed skating competition, only the one gold medal was awarded as the remaining competitors in the final were disqualified.

Medal design
The event's medal design was unveiled in February 2022.

Community Engagement

The World Games 2022 Experience Delivered by Shipt
In March 2019, The World Games 2022 unveiled a mobile experience, designed to generate excitement for the event and educate the local community on the sports of The 2022 Games. The traveling Mercedes Sprinter Van includes a rock climbing wall, a sumo wrestling activity, photo opportunities and an interactive trivia game where guests can win prizes. The van made its official debut at the 15th Annual MortgageBanc Chili Cook-Off on March 2, 2019. It continues to tour throughout 2019, 2020, 2021 and 2022.

World of Opportunity
In June 2019, The World Games 2022 announced the kickoff of their supplier diversity program, World of Opportunity. The program, which was unveiled to an audience of 400 at the Birmingham Crossplex, allows certified, diverse businesses to compete for contracts to provide goods and services for The World Games 2022. The categories accepted include (but are not limited to) transportation services, event production, security, promotional items, merchandise, sports equipment, food service, technology, printing, medical supplies, event equipment, waste removal and construction services.

Broadcasting
In July 2021, it was announced that CBS Sports Network would broadcast one-hour highlights shows on each of the ten days of competition, and two additional one-hour specials will be shown on other CBS channels and on Paramount+. Olympic Channel also carried coverage.

References

External links
Official website
Results book

 
2022
World Games
World Games
Sports competitions in Birmingham, Alabama
International sports competitions hosted by the United States
Multi-sport events in the United States
World Games
Sports events postponed due to the COVID-19 pandemic
Sports events affected by the 2022 Russian invasion of Ukraine